A trapdoor is a sliding or hinged door in a floor or ceiling. It is traditionally small in size. It was invented to facilitate the hoisting of grain up through mills, however, its list of uses has grown over time. The trapdoor has played a pivotal function in the operation of the gallows, cargo ships, trains, booby traps, and more recently theatre and films.

History

Originally, trapdoors were sack traps in mills, and allowed the sacks to pass up through the mill while naturally falling back to a closed position.

Many buildings with flat roofs have hatches that provide access to the roof. On ships, hatches—usually not flush, and never called trapdoors—provide access to the deck. Cargo ships, including bulk carriers, have large hatches for access to the holds.

Gallows
Most 19th- and early 20th-century gallows featured a trapdoor, usually with two flaps. The victim will be placed at the join. The edge of a trapdoor farthest from the hinge accelerates faster than gravity, so that the prisoner does not hit the flaps but falls freely.

Coffins
In 1784, the reusable economy coffin was mandated by Joseph II, Holy Roman Emperor. The coffins had a trapdoor in their base. The coffin would be lowered into the grave and a lever operated that opened the trapdoor, allowing the body to fall to the bottom of the grave.

Railways

The term trapdoor also refers to a plate in the entry vestibule of a passenger railcar that permits access to high-level platforms when lying flat against the floor of the car, and which can be flipped open to expose steps for accessing ground-level platforms. Many American commuter railroads which operate the Comet railcars made by Bombardier have trapdoors to accommodate passengers boarding and alighting on both high-level and ground-level platforms. Amtrak's Viewliner, Amfleet, and Horizon railcar fleets all have trapdoors.

Biology
Trapdoor spiders hide in an underground nest they line with their silk, and then conceal it with a hinged silk lid, the trapdoor.

Star traps in theatre

In theatrical use, "star traps" allowed explosively fast appearances on stage, such as jinn appearing in a puff of smoke.

Fiction
Trapdoors are occasionally used as hidden doors in fiction, as entrances to secret passageways, dungeons, or to secret tunnels. They also appear as literal traps into which a hapless pedestrian may fall if they happen to step on one. Other types of doors or other objects are also sometimes used as hidden doors.

A trapdoor features in a late scene of the 1963 film Charade. Cary Grant's character releases a trapdoor in the stage of a theatre to save Audrey Hepburn's character from Walter Matthau's character.

See also
 Trap (disambiguation)
 Angstloch
Trapdoor function

References

External links

Doors
Parts of a theatre